HSS 1500 was the name of a model of Stena HSS craft developed and originally operated by Stena Line on European international ferry routes. The vessels were the largest high-speed craft in the world. Several design patents were registered to Stena Line in the development of the HSS.

Three vessels were ultimately completed in 1996 and 1997. The first of the class, Stena Explorer, entered service in April 1996, serving the Holyhead - Dún Laoghaire route from 1996 to 2014. Two others had served Stranraer to Belfast and Harwich to Hook of Holland. On the 200-kilometre Hoek–Harwich route, the Stena HSS had cut the crossing time in half by cruising at 41 knots.

Design and construction 
Stena Explorer was constructed by Finnyards in Rauma, Finland.

The HSS 1500 is a semi-small-waterplane-area twin hull (SWATH) catamaran, and was designed with the aim of providing a comfortable and fast service.

Power is provided by four GE Aviation gas turbines in a twin COGAG configuration. The vessels employ four Kamewa waterjets for propulsion.

The HSS class of ferries were designed to allow quick turnarounds at port, in 30 minutes or less. A specially designed linkspan for the Stena HSS provides ropeless mooring and allows quick loading, unloading and servicing. Vehicles are loaded via two of the four stern doors and park in a "U" configuration. When disembarking, vehicles drive straight off via the other two doors.

Ships 
 Stena Explorer (now: One World Karadeniz) - Sold for use as office space in Turkey
 Stena Voyager - scrapped in Sweden
 Stena Discovery (later: HSS Discovery) - scrapped in Turkey

References 

High-speed craft